The 2017 Russian Cup Final decided the winner of the 2016–17 Russian Cup, the 25th season of Russia's main football cup. It was played on 2 May 2017 at the Fisht Olympic Stadium in Sochi, between Ural Yekaterinburg and Lokomotiv Moscow. Lokomotiv won the game courtesy of goals from Igor Denisov and Aleksei Miranchuk.

The winner qualified for the group stage of the UEFA Europa League and also faced the champions of the 2016–17 Russian Premier League, Spartak Moscow in the 2017 Russian Super Cup.

Venue

The Russian Cup final was held for Fisht Olympic Stadium in Sochi. The stadium, which holds 40,000 people, was constructed for the 2014 Winter Olympics and Paralympics, where it served as the venue for their opening and closing ceremonies. Following the events, the stadium was remodeled into an open-air football stadium and hosted matches as part of the 2017 FIFA Confederations Cup and 2018 FIFA World Cup.

Background

Lokomotiv played their 8th Russian Cup final, second only to CSKA's 11. Prior to the 2017 final, they have won six, against the seven won by their cross town rivals. Their most recent appearance at the final was in 2015, wherein Lokomotiv ran 3-1 winners against Kuban Krasnodar.

As for Ural, it was their first ever appearance at the Russian Cup final. Indeed, their performance in the Russian Cup has been mediocre at best, as their best outing so far has been a Round of 16 appearance in the 2009–10 Russian Cup and 2015–16 Russian Cup.

It was also the first time that the two clubs met in the Russian Cup final.

Road to the final

Match

Details

References

External links
  Russian Cup on the website of the Russian Football Union
  Department of professional football of the Russian Football Union
  Russian Cup at the RFPL website
  Russia - Cup Finals, RSSSF.com

2017
Cup Final,2017
2016–17 European domestic association football cups
Sports competitions in Sochi
FC Lokomotiv Moscow matches
FC Ural Yekaterinburg matches